HD 89998 (r Velorum) is a single star in the southern constellation of Vela. It is a faint star but visible to the naked eye with an apparent visual magnitude of 4.82. The star is moving further from the Earth with a heliocentric radial velocity of +21 km/s, having come within  some 1.552 million years ago.

This is an evolved giant star with a stellar classification of K1 III. At the estimated distance of  this star, this yields a physical size of 11.6 times the radius of the Sun. It is radiating 54 times the Sun's luminosity from its enlarged photosphere at en effective temperature of 4,812 K.

References

K-type giants
Suspected variables
Vela (constellation)
Velorum, r
Durchmusterung objects
089998
050799
4080